Voděradské bučiny (Voděrady Beechwood) is a National Nature Reserve located near the town of Černé Voděrady in the Prague-East District, Central Bohemian Region, Czech Republic. The area of the reserve is 658 ha.

There are natural beech forests on relatively acidic soil in the reserve, a type of forest habitat that needs protection. There have been found 38 species of molluscs in the reserve.

References

External links 

National nature reserves in the Czech Republic
Protected areas in Prague-East District